Andreas Öberg (born 6 August 1978) is a Swedish guitarist, songwriter, and music producer.

Music career

Öberg was born in Stockholm on 6 August 1978. When he was seven, he took classical guitar lessons at school. He played electric guitar when he was twelve years old under the influence of a teacher who played blues and jazz fusion. He studied at the Royal College of Music in Stockholm.

He began his professional career at eighteen when he worked with Viktoria Tolstoy and Svante Thuresson. In 2006, he signed with Resonance Records. He described his music at this time as a combination of jazz, funk, soul, Latin, and Brazilian music. He recorded with the Resonance Big Band on an album that received a Grammy Award nomination for Best Instrumental Arrangement. In 2009 he started a web site, Andreas' Guitar Universe, where he teaches online classes. He has worked with Barbara Hendricks, Hank Jones, Les Paul, Eros Ramazzotti, and Toots Thielemans.

Öberg was hired to write a song for a commercial that appeared on Swedish television. Since then he has composed for Universal Music. He wrote a song with Andreas Carlsson, who encouraged him to write lyrics in addition to music. As a songwriter Öberg has collaborated with Melanie Fontana and Ludwig Göransson. He has written and produced pop music for the Swedish, American, and Japanese markets.

In 2015 SHINee's album, Odd (including "Romance", co-written by Öberg), topped the Korean Gaon album chart for two consecutive weeks and the Billboard World Albums chart at the end of May 2015.

In May 2016, Namie Amuro released her single "Mint" where both the A- and B-sides ("Mint" and "Chit Chat") were co-written and co-produced by Öberg. The song sold more the 250,000 digital copies in Japan and was certified Platinum. In June 2016, EXO released their album EX'ACT, which included "Stronger", cowritten by Öberg. The album was the most sold in the world according to Global Album chart and has sold more than one million physical copies.

Öberg won the Hagström Guitar Award and the Gevalia Music Prize in 2004 and the International Guitar Competition Prize in Montreux in 2006. He taught classes at the Musicians Institute in Hollywood.

Discography
 Andreas Invites Yorgui & Ritary (Hot Club, 2004)
 Young Jazz Guitarist (Hot Club, 2005)
 Solo (Hot Club, 2006)
 Live in Concert (2006) (DVD)
 My Favorite Guitars (Resonance, 2008)
 Six String Evolution (Resonance, 2010)
 Live (Hot Club, 2013)

Notable writing credits

References

External links
Official website

Swedish songwriters
Swedish jazz guitarists
Male jazz musicians
Male guitarists
1978 births
Living people
Swedish expatriates in the United States
Jazz educators
Swedish educators
Gypsy jazz guitarists
21st-century guitarists
Resonance Records artists
Swedish male musicians